Bulgakovo is the name of several rural localities in Russia.

Modern localities

Republic of Bashkortostan
As of 2014, one rural locality in the Republic of Bashkortostan bears this name:

Bulgakovo, Republic of Bashkortostan, a selo in Bulgakovsky Selsoviet of Ufimsky District;

Ivanovo Oblast
As of 2014, one rural locality in Ivanovo Oblast bears this name:

Bulgakovo, Ivanovo Oblast, a village in Teykovsky District;

Republic of Mordovia
As of 2014, one rural locality in the Republic of Mordovia bears this name:

Bulgakovo, Republic of Mordovia, a selo in Bulgakovsky Selsoviet of Kochkurovsky District;

Moscow Oblast
As of 2014, four rural localities in Moscow Oblast bear this name:

Bulgakovo, Chekhovsky District, Moscow Oblast, a village in Stremilovskoye Rural Settlement of Chekhovsky District; 
Bulgakovo, Lukhovitsky District, Moscow Oblast, a village in Astapovskoye Rural Settlement of Lukhovitsky District; 
Bulgakovo, Noginsky District, Moscow Oblast, a village under the administrative jurisdiction of the Town of Elektrougli in Noginsky District; 
Bulgakovo, Ramensky District, Moscow Oblast, a village in Ulyaninskoye Rural Settlement of Ramensky District;

Orenburg Oblast
As of 2014, two rural localities in Orenburg Oblast bear this name:
Bulgakovo, Buzuluksky District, Orenburg Oblast, a selo in Krasnoslobodsky Selsoviet of Buzuluksky District
Bulgakovo, Saraktashsky District, Orenburg Oblast, a village in Gavrilovsky Selsoviet of Saraktashsky District

Oryol Oblast
As of 2014, two rural localities in Oryol Oblast bear this name:

Bulgakovo, Orlovsky District, Oryol Oblast, a village in Spassky Selsoviet of Orlovsky District; 
Bulgakovo, Znamensky District, Oryol Oblast, a village in Krasnikovsky Selsoviet of Znamensky District;

Ryazan Oblast
As of 2014, one rural locality in Ryazan Oblast bears this name:
Bulgakovo, Ryazan Oblast, a village in Bulgakovsky Rural Okrug of Kasimovsky District

Smolensk Oblast
As of 2014, two rural localities in Smolensk Oblast bear this name:
Bulgakovo, Dukhovshchinsky District, Smolensk Oblast, a village in Bulgakovskoye Rural Settlement of Dukhovshchinsky District
Bulgakovo, Tyomkinsky District, Smolensk Oblast, a village in Pavlovskoye Rural Settlement of Tyomkinsky District

Tambov Oblast
As of 2014, two rural localities in Tambov Oblast bear this name:
Bulgakovo, Gavrilovsky District, Tambov Oblast, a selo in Bulgakovsky Selsoviet of Gavrilovsky District
Bulgakovo, Zherdevsky District, Tambov Oblast, a village in Shpikulovsky Selsoviet of Zherdevsky District

See also
Bulgakov